Laszlo Balint may refer to:

László Bálint (born 1948), Hungarian football player
László Balint (born 1979), Romanian football player